Trentham railway station is a closed railway station in the town of Trentham, Victoria, Australia, on the former Carlsruhe-to-Daylesford line. It opened on Monday, 16 February 1880, and was closed on Monday, 3 July 1978. The station building, platform and goods shed, and a short section of track, have all been retained, although no train services currently operate from the station.

Tenants live at the station and look after it as a museum. Although most of the line's track has been removed, the land is still zoned for railway use, and track still exists for 1 km on either side of the station. The DSCR tourist railway plans to re-lay and restore track in the future. Some rolling stock is still kept in the former yard.

By 1969, the platform was 80 metres in length, with an 18.5-metre carriage dock, and by 1975, a crane and weighbridge existed at the station.

References

Disused railway stations in Victoria (Australia)